Wombat was an Australian children's television show which screened on the Seven Network from 1979 to 1990. It was produced at BTQ7 in Brisbane and aired across Australia on weekday afternoons, and later Saturday and Sunday mornings.

Synopsis 
The show had a number of hosts or presenters who were accompanied by their co-host Agro, a puppet portrayed/voiced by comedian Jamie Dunn, who had previously become known on the program Boris' Breakfast Club. The show consisted of small educational editorials presented in a variety of segments. The segments featured a number of regular reporters including Eric Summons, Cecelia Martine, Craig Campbell, Fiona MacDonald, Fran Morrison, Bob La Castra, identical twins Gayle & Gillian Blakeney, Rob Elliott, Tony Gordon, Jill Ray, Sam Harvey and Gary Hardgrave. The program also included children as regular reporters including Scott Sutherland, Pippa?  Some of these reporters performed double duty as host of the show, notably Bob La Castra and Gayle & Gillian Blakeney. Other regular guests included: Laurel Edwards, Michael Futcher, Stacey Thomson ("Ranger Stacey"), Ashley Wilkie, Kristine Davis, Nicky Gibson, and Glenn Hansen.

Awards 
The show received four consecutive Logie Awards for Most Popular Children's Program from 1987 to 1990. It also won a United Nations Media Peace Award for the 1988 Bicentennial Special. In addition, Agro won a Penguin Award from the Television Society of Australia.

Some of the cast went on to appear in the similar themed Totally Wild. Agro himself went on to host Agro's Cartoon Connection and The Super Sunday Show.

See also
List of Australian television series

External links

Wombat at the National Film and Sound Archive

Australian children's television series
Australian television shows featuring puppetry
Seven Network original programming
1979 Australian television series debuts
1990 Australian television series endings
1980s Australian television series